The type species of this genus is Biguetiella minuta.

Taxonomy 
The genus was described by Landau et al. in 1984.

Description
Biguetiella has small intra-hepatocytic schizonts (< 15 micrometres).

Hosts 
The only known host of these parasites is the intermediate roundleaf bat (Hipposideros larvatus).

Distribution 
These parasites are found in Thailand.

References 

Apicomplexa genera
Haemosporida
Taxa named by Alain Chabaud